Ailill Medraige mac Indrechtaig (died 764) was a King of Connacht from the Uí Fiachrach Muaidhe branch of the Connachta. He was the son of Indrechtach mac Dúnchado Muirisci (died 707), a previous king and grandson of Dúnchad Muirisci mac Tipraite (died 683). He was the first member of this branch since 707 to hold the Connacht throne which had been dominated by the Uí Briúin since that time. He reigned from 756 to 764.

His sobriquet Medraige implies that he was fostered by this tribe on the eastern shore of Galway Bay. His acquisition of the throne of the Uí Fiachrach branch would have occurred sometime after the death of Airechtach, another grandson of Dúnchad Muirisci, who died around 735.

In 758, he defeated the Uí Briun at the Battle of Druim Robaig (Dromrovay, S.Mayo Co.). As this was fought in the territory of the Fir Chera branch of the Uí Fiachrach, it appears that the Uí Briúin were on the offensive. Three sons of the previous Uí Briúin king Forggus mac Cellaig (died 756) were slain.

His son Cathal mac Aillelo (died 816) was a king of the Uí Fiachrach.

Notes

See also
Kings of Connacht

References

 Annals of Tigernach
 Annals of the Four Masters
 Annals of Ulster
 Francis J.Byrne, Irish Kings and High-Kings
 The Chronology of the Irish Annals, Daniel P. McCarthy

External links
CELT: Corpus of Electronic Texts at University College Cork

764 deaths
8th-century Irish monarchs
8th-century births
8th-century deaths
Kings of Connacht
Monarchs from County Mayo
People from County Galway
Year of birth unknown